Parveen Haque Sikder, known as Sikder (born 3 January 1963) is a Bangladesh Awami League politician and a Jatiya Sangsad member from the Women's Reserved Seat 39.

Background
Sikder was born on 3 January 1963 in the village of Kartikpur, Bhedarganj to industrialist Zainul Haque Sikder (1930–2021), founding chairman of Sikder Group of Companies. She has two brothers, Rick Haque Sikder and Ron Haque Sikder.

Career
Sikder was elected to the parliament from the women's reserved seat as a Bangladesh Awami League candidate in 2019. She is a director of National Bank Limited.

References

1963 births
Living people
Awami League politicians
Women members of the Jatiya Sangsad
11th Jatiya Sangsad members
21st-century Bangladeshi women politicians
21st-century Bangladeshi politicians
People from Bhedarganj Upazila